The 2016 UEFA Women's Under-17 Championship qualification' was a women's under-17 football competition organised by UEFA to determine the seven national teams joining the automatically qualified hosts Belarus in the 2016 UEFA Women's Under-17 Championship final tournament.

A total of 46 national teams, with Andorra entering a UEFA women's competition for the first time, entered this qualifying competition, which was played in two rounds between September 2015 and March 2016. Players born on or after 1 January 1999 were eligible to participate. Each match had a duration of 80 minutes, consisting of two halves of 40 minutes with a 15-minute half-time.

Format
The qualifying competition consisted of two rounds:
Qualifying round: Apart from Germany and France, which received byes to the elite round as the two teams with the highest seeding coefficient, the remaining 44 teams were drawn into 11 groups of four teams. Each group was played in single round-robin format at one of the teams selected as hosts after the draw. The 11 group winners and the 11 runners-up advanced to the elite round.
Elite round: The 24 teams were drawn into six groups of four teams. Each group was played in single round-robin format at one of the teams selected as hosts after the draw. The six group winners and the runner-up with the best record against the first and third-placed teams in their group qualified for the final tournament.

Tiebreakers
The teams were ranked according to points (3 points for a win, 1 point for a draw, 0 points for a loss). If two or more teams were equal on points on completion of a mini-tournament, the following tie-breaking criteria were applied, in the order given, to determine the rankings:
Higher number of points obtained in the mini-tournament matches played among the teams in question;
Superior goal difference resulting from the mini-tournament matches played among the teams in question;
Higher number of goals scored in the mini-tournament matches played among the teams in question;
If, after having applied criteria 1 to 3, teams still had an equal ranking, criteria 1 to 3 were reapplied exclusively to the mini-tournament matches between the teams in question to determine their final rankings. If this procedure did not lead to a decision, criteria 5 to 9 applied;
Superior goal difference in all mini-tournament matches;
Higher number of goals scored in all mini-tournament matches;
If only two teams had the same number of points, and they were tied according to criteria 1 to 6 after having met in the last round of the mini-tournament, their rankings were determined by a penalty shoot-out (not used if more than two teams had the same number of points, or if their rankings were not relevant for qualification for the next stage).
Lower disciplinary points total based only on yellow and red cards received in the mini-tournament matches (red card = 3 points, yellow card = 1 point, expulsion for two yellow cards in one match = 3 points);
Drawing of lots.

To determine the best runner-up from the elite round, the results against the teams in fourth place were discarded. The following criteria were applied:
Higher number of points;
Superior goal difference;
Higher number of goals scored;
Lower disciplinary points total based only on yellow and red cards received (red card = 3 points, yellow card = 1 point, expulsion for two yellow cards in one match = 3 points);
Drawing of lots.

Qualifying round

Draw
The draw for the qualifying round was held on 19 November 2014, 08:40 CET (UTC+1), at the UEFA headquarters in Nyon, Switzerland.

The teams were seeded according to their coefficient ranking, calculated based on the following:
2012 UEFA Women's Under-17 Championship final tournament and qualifying competition (qualifying round and elite round)
2013 UEFA Women's Under-17 Championship final tournament and qualifying competition (qualifying round and elite round)
2014 UEFA Women's Under-17 Championship final tournament and qualifying competition (qualifying round and elite round)

Each group contained one team from Pot A, one team from Pot B, and two teams from Pot C. For political reasons, Armenia and Azerbaijan (due to the disputed status of Nagorno-Karabakh), as well as Russia and Ukraine (due to the Russian military intervention in Ukraine), could not be drawn in the same group.

Notes
Belarus (Coeff: 3.500) qualified automatically for the final tournament as hosts.
Albania, Cyprus, Gibraltar, Liechtenstein, Luxembourg, Malta, and San Marino did not enter.

Groups
Times up to 24 October 2015 were CEST (UTC+2), thereafter times were CET (UTC+1).

Group 1

Group 2

Group 3

Group 4

Group 5

Group 6

Group 7

Group 8

Group 9

Group 10

Group 11

Elite round

Draw
The draw for the elite round was held on 13 November 2015, 11:45 CET (UTC+1), at the UEFA headquarters in Nyon, Switzerland.

The teams were seeded according to their results in the qualifying round. Germany and France, which received byes to the elite round, were automatically seeded into Pot A. Each group contained one team from Pot A, one team from Pot B, one team from Pot C, and one team from Pot D. Teams from the same qualifying round group could not be drawn in the same group. For political reasons, Russia and Ukraine (due to the Russian military intervention in Ukraine) could not be drawn in the same group.

Groups
Times up to 26 March 2016 were CET (UTC+1), thereafter times were CEST (UTC+2).

Group 1

Group 2

Group 3

Group 4

Group 5

Group 6

Matches on the first two matchdays, originally to be played on 24 and 26 March, were postponed to 25 and 27 March due to terrorist attacks in Belgium.

Ranking of second-placed teams
To determine the best second-placed team from the elite round qualifying for the final tournament, only the results of the second-placed teams against the first and third-placed teams in their group were taken into account.

Qualified teams
The following eight teams qualified for the final tournament:

1 Bold indicates champion for that year. Italic indicates host for that year.

Top goalscorers
The following players scored four goals or more in the qualifying competition:

9 goals

 Alessia Russo
 Georgia Stanway
 Lorena Navarro

8 goals

 Jutta Rantala
 Andrea Norheim
 Nicole Eckerle
 Allegra Poljak

7 goals

 Davinia Vanmechelen

6 goals

 Niamh Charles
 Guðrún Gyða Haralz
 Sofia Cantore
 Benedetta Glionna
 Sophie Haug
 Camilla Linberg
 Loreta Kullashi

5 goals

 Marie Minnaert
 Wilma Sjöholm
 Emmaliina Tulkki
 Despoina Chatzinikolaou
 Arianna Caruso
 Weronika Zawistowska

4 goals

 Merve Ozdemir
 Maud Asbroek
 Elise Isolde Stenevik
 Lauren Kelly
 Alena Guseva
 Matilda Ovenberger
 Géraldine Reuteler
 Leandra Schegg
 Nataliia Hryb

References

External links

Qualification
2016
2015 in women's association football
2016 in women's association football
2016 in youth sport